The discography of Rizzle Kicks, a British hip hop duo from Brighton, consisting of Jordan "Rizzle" Stephens and Harley "Sylvester" Alexander-Sule consists of two studio album and thirteen singles.

In June 2011, the duo released a promotional single, "Prophet (Better Watch It)" accompanied by a stop motion style video made up of 960 photographic stills. The track was initially offered as a free download, before being released on iTunes. Their first official single, "Down with the Trumpets", was released on 12 June 2011 in the manner of on air on sale, entering the UK Singles Chart at #84 and going on to eventually peak at #8 in September 2011. The single spent a total of 13 weeks in the Official Top 40. They featured on "Heart Skips a Beat" by Olly Murs, which was released on 21 August 2011, entering the chart at #1 on 28 August 2011. On 23 October, they released their second official single "When I Was a Youngster" which peaked at #8. The video features a cameo from Ed Sheeran. Their debut album Stereo Typical was released a week later on 31 October 2011, entering the chart at #9 and peaking at #5. Their third single "Mama Do the Hump" (produced by Norman Cook) was released on 16 December, peaking at #2 and has been certified platinum. The lo-fi video features a cameo from James Corden. Their fourth single "Traveller's Chant" was released on 8 April 2012. To date they have sold over 1 million singles and Stereo Typical was certified platinum in June 2012.

Albums

Singles

As lead artist

As featured artist

Guest appearances

Music videos

As lead artist

As featured artist

References

External links
 

Pop music discographies